Lior Ron (born March 16, 1977) is an Israeli-born businessman. He served in the Israel Defense Forces from 1997 to 2004, before attending Stanford to pursue a MBA. In 2016 he co-founded Otto, a self-driving truck company, with Anthony Levandowski, Claire Delaunay and Don Burnette. Prior to Otto he was the Product Lead for Google Maps and then the Product Lead for Motorola Mobility, which was acquired by Google in 2011.

Early life and career
In 1994 Ron entered The Technion – Israel Institute of Technology in Haifa, Israel, where he earned a bachelor's degree in Computer Science. He graduated in 1997 and from there joined Israeli Army Intelligence where he served until 2004. He left the Israeli Army to attend The Stanford Graduate School of Business where he earned his MBA. Then in 2007 he joined Google as the Product Lead for Google Maps. According to The New York Times, “he also worked in the company’s Motorola mobile phone business for three years and then in its secretive robotics research effort.”

Recent career
In 2016 Ron left Google to found Otto, a company that makes self-driving kits to retrofit big rig trucks. Quoted in Wired, Ron said he left Google because he “felt an obligation to bring this technology to society sooner rather than later.” Otto launched in May, 2016 and was acquired by Uber in late July the same year. The Uber partnership allowed Ron and Otto the opportunity to develop a freight marketplace for truck drivers. In March 2018, Ron left Uber but returned in August 2018.

On May 18, 2017, Ron and Uber launched Uber Freight, an app for long-haul truck drivers. The Uber Freight app is "targeted towards vetted and approved drivers, who can browse for nearby available loads, see destination info, distance required and payment upfront and then tap to book."

Controversy
Ron co-founded Otto with Anthony Levandowski, who faces a lawsuit from Google's parent company Alphabet that alleges Levandowski stole trade secrets while working for Alphabet's self-driving car division before he and Ron co-founded Otto.

References

1977 births
Silicon Valley people
Living people
Artificial intelligence researchers
Machine learning researchers
Businesspeople from the San Francisco Bay Area
American technology company founders
Google employees
Stanford Graduate School of Business alumni